Kandil simidi is a salty variant of the Turkish simit pastry which is eaten during the Kandil religious holiday. It is ring-shaped and coated in sesame seeds, and is sometimes flavoured with mahlep. During the five nights of Kandil, these pastries are baked and offered to neighbours and relatives.

See also 

 Bagel
 Bublik
 Ka'ak
 List of pastries

References 

Sesame seed breads
Turkish cuisine
Holiday foods